René Lateux was a French fencer. He competed in the individual sabre event at the 1908 Summer Olympics.

References

External links
 

Year of birth missing
Year of death missing
French male sabre fencers
Olympic fencers of France
Fencers at the 1908 Summer Olympics